The 1965 Davidson Wildcats football team represented Davidson College as a member of the Southern Conference (SoCon) during the 1965 NCAA University Division football season. Led by first-year head coach Homer Smith, the Wildcats compiled an overall record of 6–4 with a mark of 2–3 in conference play, tying for seventh place in the SoCon.

Schedule

References

Davidson
Davidson Wildcats football seasons
Davidson Wildcats football